The French Guiana Rugby Committee (French: Comité de Rugby de Guyane, —or officially: Comité Territorial de Rugby de Guyane) is a committee under the umbrella of the French Rugby Federation which is the governing body for rugby union within French Guiana.

It is not affiliated with the International Rugby Board (IRB) in its own right. As an overseas department of France, French Guiana can participate in international competition, but not for the Rugby World Cup.

See also
 Rugby union in French Guiana
 French Guiana national rugby union team

External links

 Comité de Rugby de Guyane on aslagnyrugby.net

Reference list

Rugby union in French Guiana
Rugby union governing bodies in South America